HMS Bredah was a 70-gun third rate ship of the line of the Kingdom of England, built at Harwich Dockyard under the 1677 Construction Programme. Her short career was fighting at Beachy Head during the War of English Succession. She was destroyed by an explosion at the Siege of Cork, Ireland in October 1690.

She was the second vessel to bear the name Bredah since it was used for a 28/48-gun vessel named Nantwich built by Bayley of Bristol in 1655, renamed Bredah in May 1660 and wrecked in 1666.

Construction and Specifications
She was ordered on 9 July 1678 to be built at Harwich Dockyard under the guidance of Master Shipwright Isaac Betts. She was launched on 26 September 1679. Her builder’s measure tonnage was calculated as 1,021 tons.

Her initial gun armament was in accordance with the 1677 Establishment with 70/62 guns consisting of twenty-six demi-cannons (54 cwt, 9.5 ft) on the lower deck, twenty-six 12-pounder guns (32 cwt, 9 ft) on the upper deck, ten sakers (16 cwt, 7 ft) on the quarterdeck and four sakers (16 cwt, 7 ft) on the foc’x’le with four 3-pounder guns (5 cwt, 5 ft) on the poop deck or roundhouse. By 1688 she would carry 70 guns as per the 1685 Establishment. Her initial manning establishment would be for a crew of 460/380/300 personnel.

Commissioned Service

HMS Bredah was commissioned on 26 July 1679 under the command of Captain John Moore to move her to Chatham Dockyard. Captain Moore died on 17 November 1679. On 30 May 1689 she was under command of Captain Christopher Mason. In 1690 Captain Matthew Tennant took command. She was engaged at the Battle of Beachy Head in Rear (Blue) Squadron on 30 June 1690. She then proceeded to the siege of Cork, Ireland later that year.

Loss
She was anchored at Spike Island, Cork with a full complement of 400 aboard, including troops and 160 Jacobite prisoners, captured after the Siege of Cork, when a gunpowder explosion occurred on 12 October 1690. She took fire and blew up. Jacobite prisoner Colonel John Barrett, who escaped, was considered to have deliberately blown up the ship. There were nine other survivors; Tennant was among those killed.

Citations

References

 Colledge (2020), Ships of the Royal Navy, by J.J. Colledge, revised and updated by Lt Cdr Ben Warlow and Steve Bush, published by Seaforth Publishing, Barnsley, Great Britain, © 2020,  (EPUB), Section N (Northumberland)
 Winfield (2009), British Warships in the Age of Sail (1603 – 1714), by Rif Winfield, published by Seaforth Publishing, England © 2009, EPUB 
 Lavery, Brian (2003) The Ship of the Line - Volume 1: The Development of the Battlefleet 1650-1850. Conway Maritime Press. 
 Clowes (1898), The Royal Navy, A History from the Earliest Times to the Present (Vol. II). London. England: Sampson Low, Marston & Company, © 1898

Ships of the line of the Royal Navy
1670s ships
Ships built in Harwich